Shurestan (also Romanized as Shūrestān and Shoorestan; also known as Sarāi Nau and Sarāy-e Now) is a village in Momenabad Rural District, in the Central District of Sarbisheh County, South Khorasan Province, Iran. At the 2006 census, its population was 145, in 57 families.

References 

Populated places in Sarbisheh County